Sacbrood virus or SBV disease is an infectious disease caused by the Morator aetatulas virus that affects honey bee larvae. When sick, the colony declines gradually with few or no replacement workers, costing 20-80% of honey production.

Reasons
SBV is caused by the M. aetatulas virus. Transmission is due to bees taking care of larvae, other bees entering the colony to steal, bees entering the wrong hive through a source of flowers, or through beekeepers' activities (changing bridges, importing hives, etc). The disease spreads and flares up when the operation of importing bee breeds is not controlled.

According to Borchert, when studying the disease in 1966, one diseased larva could infect 3,000 healthy larvae. Bailey in 1981 claimed that the liquid in a killed larva containing 1 mg of virus can infect all worker larvae of 1,000 healthy bees.

Symptoms
When sick bees go to work, particularly heavy hives noticed that bees take dead larvae out of the nest. The screw cap on the pupil surface is sunken, and a few small pinholes are present. The larvae die at the new stage screw cap (pupa). At the pointed tip of the diseased larva protruding between the nest holes, the tip of the larvae tilts towards the abdomen.  At the larvae's end is a small transparent water bag. Dead larvae have no odor.

Prevention and treatment 
The best preventative measures are hygiene of means, transporting tools and beekeeping tools when trading, importing, and transporting bees and products, as well as inspecting and interacting with bees; when importing the breeds, choose healthy, clean and clear hives.

Antibiotics do not affect this disease. Biological techniques such as replacing the sick lord with a royal cap or silk thread, confining the hive for 8-10 days, removing bridges so that the bees thicken the remaining bridges, feeding 5-6 nights in a row to transfer to a new and better source of flowers and isolation from other bee farms and merging the weakening hive.

See also
Evolution of the Sacbrood Virus

References

Iflaviridae
Western honey bee pests
Bee diseases